Darwin Mott (born August 19, 1950) is a Canadian former professional ice hockey player. He was selected by the Calgary Broncos in the late rounds of the 1972 WHA General Player Draft.

During the 1972–73 season, Mott played one game in the World Hockey Association with the Philadelphia Blazers. He is the brother of Morris Mott, who played in both the National Hockey League and the WHA; the two played together for Västra Frölunda IF in Sweden in 1975-76.

References

External links

1950 births
Living people
Calgary Broncos draft picks
Canadian expatriate ice hockey players in Sweden
Canadian expatriate ice hockey players in the United States
Canadian ice hockey left wingers
Dayton Gems players
Frölunda HC players
Kimberley Dynamiters players
Michigan Tech Huskies men's ice hockey players
Philadelphia Blazers players
Phoenix Roadrunners (WHL) players
Salt Lake Golden Eagles (CHL) players
Toledo Goaldiggers players
Trail Smoke Eaters players